Korach may refer to:

 Korah, son of Izhar, leader of a rebellion against Moses recounted in Numbers 16
 Korah (son of Esau), a biblical character mentioned in Genesis 36:5
 Korach (parsha), the 38th weekly Torah portion in the annual Jewish cycle of Torah reading

People with the surname
 Ken Korach (21st century), play-by-play announcer for the Oakland Athletics